A penumbral lunar eclipse took place at the Moon's ascending node on 11 February 2017, the first of two lunar eclipses in 2017. It was not quite a total penumbral lunar eclipse. It occurred the same day as comet 45P/Honda–Mrkos–Pajdušáková made a close approach to Earth (0.08318 AU). It also occurred on the Lantern Festival, the first since 9 February 2009. Occurring only 4.4 days after perigee (Perigee on 6 February 2017), the moon's apparent diameter was larger.

Visibility 
It was visible from the Americas, Europe, Africa, and most of Asia.

Gallery

Related eclipses

Eclipses of 2017 
 A penumbral lunar eclipse on 11 February.
 An annular solar eclipse on 26 February.
 A partial lunar eclipse on 7 August.
 A total solar eclipse on 21 August.

Lunar year series

Saros series 
It is part of Saros cycle 114.

Lunar Saros series 114, repeating every 18 years and 11 days, has a total of 71 lunar eclipse events including 13 total lunar eclipses.

First Penumbral Lunar Eclipse: 0971 May 13

First Partial Lunar Eclipse: 1115 Aug 07

First Total Lunar Eclipse: 1458 Feb 28

First Central Lunar Eclipse: 1530 Apr 12

Greatest Eclipse of Lunar Saros 114: 1584 May 24

Last Central Lunar Eclipse: 1638 Jun 26

Last Total Lunar Eclipse: 1674 Jul 17

Last Partial Lunar Eclipse: 1890 Nov 26

Last Penumbral Lunar Eclipse: 2233 Jun 22

Half-Saros cycle
A lunar eclipse will be preceded and followed by solar eclipses by 9 years and 5.5 days (a half saros). This lunar eclipse is related to two annular solar eclipses of Solar Saros 121.

Tritos series 
 Preceded: Lunar eclipse of March 14, 2006
 Followed: Lunar eclipse of January 12, 2028

Tzolkinex 
 Preceded: Lunar eclipse of December 31, 2009
 Followed: Lunar eclipse of March 25, 2024

See also 
 List of lunar eclipses and List of 21st-century lunar eclipses

References

External links

 
 11 Feb 2017 - Penumbral Lunar Eclipse - Penumbral Lunar Eclipse
 Pakistan to witness lunar eclipse on February 11

2017-02
2017 in science
February 2017 events